The 1954 Virginia Cavaliers football team represented the University of Virginia during the 1954 college football season. The Cavaliers were led by second-year head coach Ned McDonald and played their home games at Scott Stadium in Charlottesville, Virginia. This was their first year competing in the Atlantic Coast Conference, which was in its second year of existence. Virginia failed to pick up its first ACC win, finishing 0–2 against conference opponents.

Schedule

References

Virginia
Virginia Cavaliers football seasons
Virginia Cavaliers football